Pool B of the 2016 Fed Cup Asia/Oceania Group II was one of two pools in the Asia/Oceania Group II of the 2016 Fed Cup. Six teams competed in a round robin competition, with the top team and bottom teams proceeding to their respective sections of the play-offs: the top team played for advancement to Group I.

Standings

Round-robin

Indonesia vs. Sri Lanka

Malaysia vs. Kyrgyzstan

Singapore vs. Pakistan

Indonesia vs. Kyrgyzstan

Malaysia vs. Pakistan

Singapore vs. Sri Lanka

Indonesia vs. Singapore

Malaysia vs. Sri Lanka

Pakistan vs. Kyrgyzstan

Indonesia vs. Pakistan

Malaysia vs. Singapore

Kyrgyzstan vs. Sri Lanka

Indonesia vs. Malaysia

Singapore vs. Kyrgyzstan

Pakistan vs. Sri Lanka

See also
Fed Cup structure

References

External links
 Fed Cup website

2016 Fed Cup Asia/Oceania Zone